The Altina railway station is a railway stop that serves the Altina neighborhood of Zemun, Serbia.

Along with the nearby  train stop, the Altina stop was constructed as part of the Belgrade–Novi Sad railway reconstruction of 2019–2022. It is served by BG Voz urban rail trains.

Layout 

The stop has two side platforms, each 110 meters long, serving two tracks that are some 50 meters apart. Between them runs a service track leading to the nearby Zemun marshalling yard. The platforms are connected by an underground passageway.

Services and access 

The stop has free parking lots and bicycle racks outside both platforms. Elevator shafts have been constructed but the elevators were not put in use as of April 2022. The stop features an automated public address system and information in Braille on hand railings.

Nearby are bus stops served by city bus lines 81 and 81L.

Gallery

See also 
BG Voz

References 

Railway stations in Belgrade
Zemun